The governor of Ivanovo Oblast is the highest official of Ivanovo Oblast, a region in Central Russia. He heads the government of Ivanovo Oblast and is elected by direct popular vote for the term of five years.

History of office 
Until the spring of 1990, the regional committees (obkom) of the Communist Party of the Soviet Union enjoyed the unlimited power over de iure institutions, such as regional Soviet and its executive committee (ispolkom). With the abolition of the Article 6 of the Soviet Constitution, which defined the "leading and guiding role" of the CPSU in country's politics, the chairman of the Soviet became the senior official in the region. Most of the regional party bosses began to be elected as speakers, until in the fall of 1990, the RSFSR authorities prohibited combining the posts of party and Soviet leader. Many of the first secretaries of the CPSU obkoms resigned from their party posts and focused on their work as speakers of the Soviets.

From 1990 to 1994, Vladislav Tikhomirov was the chairman of Ivanovo Oblast ispolkom. In March 1990, Tikhomirov was elected chairman of the Soviet, and on June 2, he succeeded Mikhail Knyazyuk as the first secretary of the CPSU regional committee. However, in August he left this position.

In late 1991, at the beginning of the radical reforms, the President of Russia Boris Yeltsin had virtually unlimited powers to form executive branch of the regions. He introduced the post of Head of Administration instead of chairmen of ispolkoms. So on 24 December 1991, 56-year-old Adolf Laptev was appointed head of administration of Ivanovo Oblast, previously worked as the first deputy chairman of Ivanovo Oblast ispolkom under Vladislav Tikhomirov.

In January 1996, Laptev resigned due to deteriorating health. Since February 1, Vladislav Tikhomirov was appointed head of administration, who was the chairman of the Legislative Assembly since 1994. On December 1, the first gubernatorial election took place in Ivanovo Oblast, which was won by Vladislav Tikhomirov. His term of office was four years. In the new Charter of Ivanovo Oblast, adopted in 2000, the terms of office of the governor and the legislature were extended to five years.

From 2005 to 2012 governor of Ivanovo Oblast, as well as heads of other Russian regions, was not elected by popular vote, but approved by Ivanovo Oblast Duma from the list of candidates proposed by president of Russia.

List of officeholders

References 

Politics of Ivanovo Oblast
 
Ivanovo